Athetis nonagrica is a moth of the  family Noctuidae. It is found in Borneo, Peninsular Malaysia, Sulawesi and New Guinea.

Taxonomy
The name nonagrica has been applied consistently to specimens that are in fact the more widespread species Athetis thoracica.

External links
Moths of Borneo

Acronictinae
Moths of Asia
Moths of Oceania